The Stanford Cardinal baseball team represents Stanford University in NCAA Division I college baseball. Along with most other Stanford athletic teams, the baseball team participates in the Pac-12 Conference. The Cardinal play their home games on campus at Klein Field at Sunken Diamond, and they are currently coached by David Esquer.

Head coaches

Year-by-year record

Stadium

Klein Field at Sunken Diamond is one of the premier collegiate baseball stadiums in the country. When the football stadium was originally built in 1921, dirt was excavated from the site of the future baseball stadium, which created a "sunken" field a decade later.

Record versus opponent

 Last updated at the conclusion of the 2022 Regional.

Record against Pac-12

Last updated at the conclusion of the 2022 conference tournament.

Stanford in the NCAA tournament
The Cardinal have appeared in the NCAA Division I baseball tournament 31 times, and appearing in the College World Series 16 times.  They have won two National Championships, in 1987 College World Series and 1988.

Future major league outfielder Sam Fuld's 24 career hits broke the College World Series record of 23 set by Keith Moreland in 1973–75.

Former Cardinal in MLB

Rubén Amaro Jr.
Alex Blandino
Eric Bruntlett
Jason Castro
Erik Davis
Sam Fuld
Ryan Garko
Jody Gerut
Jeremy Guthrie
A. J. Hinch
Nico Hoerner
Andrew Lorraine
Jed Lowrie
John Mayberry Jr.
Tommy Edman
Jack McDowell
Mike Mussina
Cord Phelps
Stephen Piscotty
Carlos Quentin
Bruce Robinson
Jack Shepard
Austin Slater
Drew Storen
Steve Buechele
Former NFL Quarterback and current Denver Broncos executive John Elway also played baseball at Stanford for two seasons.

See also
List of NCAA Division I baseball programs

References

External links